Iwan Shenton is a Welsh rugby union player, currently playing for United Rugby Championship side Scarlets. His preferred position is flanker.

Career
As a youth player, Shenton played for Tonna RFC and was part of the Ospreys Academy. He played for Cardiff Met in the BUCS Super Rugby competition. Shenton also played for Aberavon in the Indigo Group Premiership.

For the 2022–2023 season, Shenton signed for the Scarlets. Shenton made his first appearance in a preseason friendly against Bristol Bears. He made his competitive debut for the Scarlets in Round 7 of the 2022–23 United Rugby Championship against Leinster. On 10 March 2023, Shenton started against the Saracens in a friendly, and scored his first try.

Shenton also plays for Llanelli RFC, serving as captain on numerous occasions.

References

External Links
Aberavon profile
Scarlets profile

2000 births
Living people
Scarlets players
Aberavon RFC players
Welsh rugby union players
Rugby union flankers